Aljapur is a village in the Karmala taluka of Solapur district in Maharashtra state, India.

Demographics
Covering  and comprising 345 households at the time of the 2011 census of India, Aljapur had a population of 1668. There were 919 males and 749 females, with 206 people being aged six or younger.

References

Villages in Karmala taluka